155th Street is a crosstown street separating the Harlem and Washington Heights neighborhoods, in the New York City borough of Manhattan. It is the northernmost of the 155 crosstown streets mapped out in the Commissioner's Plan of 1811 that established the numbered street grid in Manhattan. The street consists of a "high portion" which is a major artery through the area, as well as a lesser-used "low portion".

The "high" portion of 155th Street starts on the West Side at Riverside Drive, crossing Broadway, Amsterdam Avenue, and St. Nicholas Avenue. A separate, unconnected section of 155th Street runs under the viaduct, connecting Bradhurst Avenue and the Harlem River Drive.

The New York City Subway serves the high part of 155th Street at 155th Street/St. Nicholas Avenue on the IND Eighth Avenue Line and the low portion at 155th Street/Frederick Douglass Boulevard on the IND Concourse Line.

Points of interest
Highbridge Park – situated on the banks of the Harlem River near the northernmost tip of Manhattan, between 155th Street and Dyckman Street.
Polo Grounds – The second and third (final) incarnations of the famed stadium were located at was then 8th Avenue from 1889 to 1963, in Coogan's Hollow on the north side of the viaduct. Over its life, it was home of the New York Giants (1889–1957), New York Yankees (1913–1922) and New York Mets (1962–1963) baseball franchises, and the New York Giants (1925–1955) and New York Jets (1960–1963) football teams.
Rucker Park – located at Frederick Douglass Boulevard, Rucker Park is one of the premier havens of streetball, and its summer league has been the launching point for many NBA players.
Hispanic Society of America – Museum of Spanish, Portuguese, and Latin American art and artifacts, as well as a rare books and manuscripts and research library, located at Audubon Terrace.
Trinity Church Cemetery and Mausoleum, on the south side of 155th between Broadway and Riverside Drive.

References

External links 

 I Can't Drive 155, Forgotten-NY

155
Harlem
Washington Heights, Manhattan